Chnuor Mean Chey is a khum (communes) of Preah Netr Preah District in Banteay Meanchey Province in north-western Cambodia.

Villages

 Samraong Touch
 Pongro
 Thma Koul
 Proput
 Bantoat Baoh
 Kouk Treas
 Chhnuor
 Samraong Thum
 Ruessei Khang
 Ruessei Kandal
 Rumpeak
 Kouk Trach

References

Communes of Banteay Meanchey province
Preah Netr Preah District